Geoffrey Zanelli (born September 28, 1974) is an American composer working primarily in the medium of film, television, and video game scores. His early career was notable for scoring additional music on roughly 30 film scores written by Hans Zimmer, John Powell, Harry Gregson-Williams, and Steve Jablonsky including several blockbuster films. He has since moved on to more solo work, winning a Primetime Emmy Award for Outstanding Music Composition for a Limited Series, Movie, or Special for his score to the miniseries Into the West.

Aside from film and television scores, Zanelli also works with recording artists, writing arrangements for Steve Martin, Edie Brickell, Robbie Williams, The Webb Sisters, Mest and Story of the Year.  He is credited as a guitarist/bassist/keyboardist on the song "I'm Not Dead" from recording artist Pink.

Life and work
Zanelli was born on September 28, 1974 in Westminster, California.  He graduated in 1996 from Berklee College of Music. 

In 1994, at 19 years old, Zanelli met Hans Zimmer, believing him to be a promising young talent, Zimmer invited him to Los Angeles to join his group of film composers. Zanelli worked as an engineer on the debut album from Goldfinger as well as Zimmer's score for The Preacher's Wife.

Zanelli's experience and desire to collaborate led him to work with British composer John Powell on his first Hollywood feature, Face/Off. Throughout the following years he built the foundation for his scoring career, composing with Powell, Hans Zimmer, Harry Gregson-Williams, and Steve Jablonsky on many feature films, including: Pirates of the Caribbean: The Curse of the Black Pearl, Pirates of the Caribbean: On Stranger Tides, Rango and the Golden Globe-nominated scores for The Last Samurai and Pearl Harbor.

One of his earliest solo works, Steven Spielberg's miniseries Into the West, earned him an Emmy. In approximately one year, Zanelli scored the films Disturbia, Hitman, Outlander, Delgo, Ghost Town and Gamer. 

In early 2013, film blog Ain't It Cool News called his score for The Odd Life of Timothy Green the best score of 2012. In 2017, he composed the score to Pirates of the Caribbean: Dead Men Tell No Tales, picking up the mantle from long-time series composer Hans Zimmer. In June 2018, he composed the score, with Jon Brion, in Christopher Robin.

Filmography

Film

As primary score composer

As composer of additional music

Television

Video games

Awards and nominations

References

External links
 Official Website
 

American film score composers
American male film score composers
Berklee College of Music alumni
La-La Land Records artists
Living people
Musicians from California
Primetime Emmy Award winners
Video game composers
Year of birth missing (living people)